Following is a list of notable architects from Malaysia

A–M

 C.H.R Bailey
Great Hall and Admin building University of Malaya
Kuala Lumpur International Airport at Subang
St Joseph's Cathedral, Kuching
Chartered Bank Building HQ Kuala Lumpur
Supervising Architect and design of the Dome Minaret and Lagoon of Omar Ali Saifuddien Mosque Brunei
 Parliament Buildings Brunei
 Mercantile Bank HQ Kuala Lumpur
 David A. Aitken
Sungei Pari Towers (Ipoh, Malaysia)
 E. S. COOKE
 Howard Ashley
 National Mosque of Malaysia (Malaysia)
 Federal Building of Petaling Jaya (Malaysia) 
 Arthur Oakley Coltman (1894-1961)
 Anglo-Oriental Building (Kuala Lumpur)
 Clock Tower (Kuala Lumpur)
 Lee Rubber Building (Kuala Lumpur) 
 Odeon Cinema (Kuala Lumpur)
 Oriental Building (Kuala Lumpur) 
 Rubber Research Institute of Malaya (Kuala Lumpur) 
 Sultan Omar Ali Saifuddin Mosque (Brunei)
 Kenneth Cavendish Duncan
 British Council Building, Kuala Lumpur
 Maternity Hospital, Kuala Lumpur Hospital
 Goh Hock Guan (1934-2018)
 Hijjas Kasturi (born 1936)
 Menara Maybank (Malaysia)
 Menara Telekom (Malaysia)
 Tabung Haji (Malaysia)
 Putrajaya Convention Centre (Malaysia)
 Shah Alam Stadium (Malaysia)
 Arthur Benison Hubback (1871-1948)
 Ipoh railway station (Malaysia)
 Kuala Lumpur Railway Station
 Masjid Jamek (Malaysia)
 Post Office (Malaysia)
 Royal Selangor Club (Malaysia)
 Ubudiah Mosque (Malaysia)
 Berthel Michael Iversen (1906-1976)
 Cathay Cinema (Ipoh)
 Denmark House (Kuala Lumpur)
 Lido Cinema (Ipoh)
 P.H. Keyes
 Hotel Majestic (Kuala Lumpur, Malaysia)
 T.Y. Lee
 Central Market
 Mimaland
 Yoon Thim Lee (1905-1977)
 Al-Rahman Mosque, University of Malaya (Malaysia) 
 Federal Hotel, Kuala Lumpur (Malaysia) 
 Chin Woo Stadium, Kuala Lumpur (Malaysia)
 Chinese Maternity Hospital (Malaysia)
 East Asia Building (Malaysia) 
 Methodist Boys School - Sentul: addition 
 Kampung Baru Mosque (Malaysia) 
 UMNO Building 
 Kington Loo (1930-2003)
 S.P.C. Merer
 Federal Building of Petaling Jaya (Malaysia)
 Kuala Lumpur International Airport (Malaysia)

N–Z

 Arthur Charles Alfred Norman (1858-1944)
 Government Printing Office
 High Court Building (Malaysia)
 Sultan Abdul Samad Building
 Ken Yeang (born 1948)
 Menara Mesiniaga (Malaysia)
 National Library, Singapore (Singapore)
 Nik Mohamed Mahmood
Karthikeyan G (1949-2015)
Sarly Adre Sarkum (born 1975)
Tan Loke Mun (born 1965)
S11 house (Malaysia)
 Thomas A.S. Tiang
 Ampang Park (Malaysia)
 Pertama Shopping Complex (Malaysia)
 Pudu Plaza Malaysia (Malaysia)

See also

 Architecture of Malaysia
 List of architects
 List of Malaysians

References

External links
 Malaysian Institute of Architects
 Board of Architects Malaysia

Malaysian
Architects